Uttar Kanya is a building in satellite township of which houses the temporary State Secretariat for North Bengal Development Department of West Bengal. It was inaugurated on 20 January 2014 by Chief Minister, Mamata Banerjee.

Geography 

History
On 20 January 2014, West Bengal Chief Minister Mamata Banerjee had inaugurated the mini-state secretariat for North Bengal in Siliguri, in a bid to expedite development in the region and remove bottlenecks in governance.

District covers
North Bengal comprises seven districts- Darjeeling district, Jalpaiguri district, Alipurduar district, Coochbehar district, North Dinajpur, South Dinajpur and Malda district.

References

Government of West Bengal
Government buildings in West Bengal
Administrative headquarters of state governments in India
2012 establishments in West Bengal
Buildings and structures in Darjeeling